This article lists the districts of Murcia in Spain.  Murcia has 54 districts, which are named pedanías.

La Albatalía 
This district is placed in the northwestern quarter of Murcia and has a surface of 1.92 km2. It is adjacent to the main town, La Arboleja and Guadalupe. There were 2,040 inhabitants in 2019.

La Alberca 
It covers 10.275 km2 and shares borders with Aljucer, Santo Ángel, Baños y Mendigo and El Palmar. 12,755 people resided there in 2019.

Algezares 
This district adjoins Garres y Lages, Beniaján, Gea y Truyols, Baños y Mendigo, Santo Ángel and San Benito - Patiño. It has an area of 24.74 km2An important building of Murcia is located in this territory and it is Nuestra Señora de la Fuensanta Sanctuary.

Aljucer 
This territory is located in the northern half of Murcia. Its surface consists of 4.181 km2.  It is adjacent to the main city, San Benito - Patiño, La Alberca, El Palmar, San Ginés and Era Alta.

Alquerías 
It occurs in the northeastern quarter of Murcia and covers an area of 7.87 km2. It is adjacent to El Raal, Beniel municipality, Zeneta, Los Ramos and Santa Cruz.

La Arboleja 
This territory is placed in the northern half of the municipality. Its surface consists of 1.624 km2. It adjoins La Albatalía, the main city, Rincón de Seca and Rincón de Beniscornia.

Baños y Mendigo 
This district occurs in the southern half of Murcia. It has an area of 58.725 km2. It shares borders with Santo Ángel, Algezares, Gea y Truyols, Los Martínez del Puerto, Valladolises, Corvera and El Palmar.

Barqueros 
It is placed in the west end of the municipality and is the place that is the most in the west in Murcia. Its surface consists of 19.75 km2. It adjoins to Cañada Hermosa, Sangonera la Seca, Librilla municipality and Mula municipality.

Beniaján 

It occurs in the southwest of the northeastern quarter of Murcia and covers an area of 13.924 km2. The district is adjacent to Llano de Brujas, Torreagüera, Cañadas de San Pedro, Algezares, Garres y Lages, San José de la Vega, Los Dolores and Puente Tocinos.

Cabezo de Torres 
This district is placed in the north of the municipality and covers 14.375 km2. It adjoins Molina de Segura, El Esparragal, Monteagudo, Zaradona, Santiago y Zaraiche and Churra.

Cañada Hermosa 
This territory is located in the northwest end of Murcia and covers 44.135 km2. It shares borders with Las Torres de Cotillas municipality, Javalí Nuevo, Alcantarilla municipality, Sangonera la Seca, Barqueros, Mula municipality and Campos del Río municipality. It had a population of 107 in 2019.

Cañadas de San Pedro 
It occurs in the east end of the municipality and has a surface of 66.093 km2. The district adjoins Sucina, Gea y Truyols, Algezares, Beniaján, Torreagüera, Los Ramos, Zeneta and Orihuela municipality. 337 people resided in the territory in 2019.

Carrascoy 
The district is located in the southwest end of Murcia. Its area consists in 30.325 km2. It is adjacent to Sangonera la Seca, Sangonera la Verde, Corvera and Fuente Álamo de Murcia municipality.

Casillas 
It is located in the northeastern quarter of Murcia and covers an area of 2.488 km2. It shares borders with Monteagudo, Llano de Brujas, Puente Tocinos and Zarandona.

Churra 
This territory occurs in the north of the municipality. Its surface consists in 5.6 km2. It adjoins Cabezo de Torres, Santiago y Zaraiche, Murcia and El Puntal.

Cobatillas 
This territory is placed in the northeastern of Murcia and has an area of 5.98 km2. It is adjacent to Santomera municipality, El Raal, Santa Cruz and El Esparragal.

Corvera 
It is located in the south of Murcia and covers 44.857 km2. It shares borders with El Palmar, Baños y Mendigo, Valladolises, Fuente Álamo de Murcia municipality, Carrascoy and Sangonera La Verde.

Los Dolores 
This district is placed in the northern half of the municipality. It adjoins Puente Tocinos, Beniaján, San José de la Vega, Garres y Lages, San Benito - Barrio del Progreso and the main city.

Era Alta 
This district occurs in the northwestern quarter of the municipality. Its area consists of 2.25 km2. It adjoins Nonduermas, the main city, Aljucer, El Palmar and San Ginés.

El Esparragal 
It is located in the north end and is the most northern part of Murcia and has a surface of 31.728 km2. The district is adjacent to Cobatillas, Santa Cruz, Llano de Brujas, Casillas, Monteagudo and Cabezo de Torres.

Garres y Lages 
This district adjoins Los Dolores, San José de la Vega, Beniaján, Algezares, San Benito - Patiño and San Benito - Barrio del Progreso.

Gea y Truyols 
It occurs in the southeastern quarter of Murcia and has a surface of 51.383 km2. It is adjacent to Cañadas de San Pedro, Sucina, Jerónimo y Avileses, Torre-Pacheco municipality, Los Martínez del Puerto, Baños y Mendigo and Algezares.

Guadalupe 
This territory is placed in the northwest quarter of the municipality and covers 6.008 km2. It adjoins El Puntal, Murcia, La Albatalía, Rincón de Beniscornia, La Ñora, Javalí Viejo and Molina de Segura municipality.

Javalí Nuevo 
This district is located in the northwestern quarter of Murcia. Its area consists of 8.95 km2.It is adjacent to Torres de Cotillas municipality, Javalí Viejo, Alcantarilla municipality and Cañada Hermosa. The territory population consisted of 3.231 in 2019.

Javalí Viejo 
It is placed in the northwestern of the municipality and has a surface of 4.27 km2. It adjoins Molina de Segura municipality, Guadalupe, La Ñora, Pueblo de Soto, Alcantarilla municipality and Javalí Nuevo. 2,283 people resided in the district in 2019.

Jerónimo y Avileses 
It is located in the southeast of Murcia and has an area of 39.437 km2. The district shares borders with Sucina, San Javier municipality, Torre-Pachecho municipality and Gea y Truyols.

Llano de Brujas 
This territory occurs in the northeastern quarter of Murcia and covers7.3 km2. It is adjacent to El Esparragal, Santa Cruz, Los Ramos, Torreagüera, Beniaján, Puente Tocinos and Casillas.

Lobosillo 
It is an exclave of the municipality and occurs in the south. Its area consists of 12.162 km2.  It is adjacent to Torre-Pacheco and Fuente Álamo.

Los Martínez del Puerto 

It occurs in the southend of Murcia and covers 29.625 km2. It shares borders with Baños y Mendigo, Gea y Truyols, Torre-Pacheco municipality and Valladolises.

Monteagudo 
It is located in the northern half of the municipality. The district has a surface of 5.172 km2. It adjoins El Esparragal, Casillas, Zaradona and Cabezo de Torres. There is an historical site: Monteagudo fortress,.

Nonduermas 
This territory occurs in the northwestern quarter of Murcia and covers an area of 2.755 km2. It shares borders with La Raya, Rincón de Seca, the main city, Era Alta, San Ginés, Sangonera la Seca, Alcantarilla municipality and Puebla de Soto.

La Ñora 
This territory occurs in the northwestern quarter of Murcia. It covers 2.350 km2. It is adjacent to Guadalupe, Rincón de Beniscornia, La Raya, Puebla de Soto and Javalí Viejo.

El Palmar 

It is the most populated district of the municipality after the main town and 23,889 people resided there in 2019. It has a surface of 26.039 km2. It is located in the western half of Murcia. The district shares borders with Aljucer, La Alberca, Baños y Mendigo, Corvera, Sangonera la Verde and San Ginés. There is a campus of the University of Murcia in the territory.

Puebla de Soto 
This district occurs in the northwestern quarter of Murcia. It has an area of 1.745 km2. It adjoins La Ñora, La Raya, Nonduermas and Alcantarilla municipality. Its population consisted of 1,749 in 2019.

Puente Tocinos 
It is the second most populated district of the municipality and, 16,655 people resided there in 2019.Its surface consists in 5.335 km2. It shares borders with Casillas, Llano de Brujas, Beniaján, Los Dolores, Murcia and Zarandona.

El Puntal 
This territory occurs in the northwest end of Murcia. It has an area of 9.687 km2. It shares borders with Churra, Murcia, Guadalupe and Molina de Segura.

El Raal 

This district is placed in the northeast of Murcia and has a surface of 8,178 km2. It adjoins Santomera municipality, Beniel municipality, Alquerías, Santa Cruz and Cobatillas. It had a population of 6,334 in 2019.

Los Ramos 
This territory occurs in the northeastern quarter. Its area consists of 6.5 km2. It is adjacent to Alquerías, Zeneta, Cañadas de San Pedro, Torreagüera, Llano de Brujas and Cruz.

La Raya 
It is located in the northwestern quarter of the municipality and covers 2.901 km2. The territory shares borders with Rincón de Beniscornia, Rincón de Seca, Nonduermas and Puebla de Soto.

Rincón de Beniscornia 
This territory is located in the northwestern quarter of Murcia and has a surface of 1.008 km2. The district adjoins Guadalupe, Rincón de Seca, La Raya and La Ñora. There were 954 inhabitants in 2019.

Rincón de Seca 
It is placed in the northwestern quarter of the municipality. Its area consists in 1.7 km2. The territory shares borders with La Arboleja, the main city, Nonduermas, La Raya and Rincón de Beniscornia. Its population consisted of 2,267 in 2019.

San Benito - Patiño 
This district is placed in the northern half of the municipality. It covers 4.075 km2. It adjoins the main city, San Benito - Barrio del Progreso, Garres y Lages, Algezares, Santo Ángel and Aljucer.

San Benito - Barrio del Progreso 
It is located in the northern half of Murcia. It has an area of 4.075 km2. The territory shares borders with Los Dolores, Garres y Lages, San Benito - Patiño and the main city.

San Ginés 
It is placed in the southeast of the northwestern quarter of Murcia and has a surface of 2.477 km2. It adjoins Nonduermas, Era Alta, El Palmar and Sangonera la Seca.

Sangonera La Seca 
This is the largest district and covers 74.208 km2. It is located in the west of the municipality. It shares borders with San Ginés, El Palmar, Corvera, Carrascoy and Sangonera la Verde.

Sangonera La Verde 
This territory is placed in the western half of Murcia. Its surface consists in 14.418 km2. It adjoins Cañada Hermosa, Alcantarilla municipality, Nonduermas, San Ginés, Sangonera la Verde, Carrascoy, Alhama de Murcia municipality and Librilla municipality.

San José de la Vega 
This district is placed in the southwestern of the northeastern quarter of the municipality. It has an area of 2.244 km2. The territory shares borders with Beniaján, Garres y Lages and Los Dolores.

Santa Cruz 
It occurs in the northeast of Murcia and covers 4.239 km2. The district shares borders with Cobatillas, El Raal, Alquerías, Los Ramos, Llano de Brujas an dEl Esparragal.

Santiago y Zaraiche 
It is placed in the north of Murcia and has a surface of 1.26 km2. The territory is adjacent to Cabezo de Torres, Zarandona, the main city and Churra.

Santo Ángel 
This territory is located in the centre of the municipality. Its area consists in 6.983 km2. It shares borders with San Benito - Patiño, Algeazares, Baños y Mendigo, La Alberca and Aljucer.

Sucina 
It occurs in the southeast end of the municipality. The district covers 65.361 km2.  It shares borders with Cañadas de San Pedro, San Pedro del Pinatar municipality, San Javier municipality, Jerónimo y Avileses and Gea y Truyols.

Torreagüera 
This territory occurs in the northeastern quarter of Murcia. Its surface consists in 7.773 km2. It adjoins Llano de Brujas, Los Ramos, Cañadas de San Pedro and Beniaján.

Valladolises 
It is placed in the south of Murcia and is the most southern territory in Murcia after the exclave Lobosillo. The territory covers 42.614 km2. The district is adjacent to Baños y Mendigo, Los Martínez del Puerto and Fuente Álamo de Murcia municipality.

Zarandona 
The territory is placed in the northern half of Murcia and has a surface of 2.395 km2. It adjoins Cabezo de Torres, Monteagudo, Casillas, Puente Tocinos, Murcia and Santiago y Zaraiche.

Zeneta 
This district is located in the northeastern quarter of the municipality and has an area of 8.425 km2. It shares borders with Beniel municipality, Cañadas de San Pedro, Los Ramos and Alquerías.

References 
 

Region of Murcia
Murcia